The 2005–06 Kansas Jayhawks men's basketball team represented the University of Kansas Jayhawks for the NCAA Division I men's intercollegiate basketball season of 2005–06.  The team was led by Bill Self in his third season as head coach.  The team played its home games in Allen Fieldhouse in Lawrence, Kansas.

In 2005–06 the Jayhawks fielded one of the youngest teams in the nation, by the end of the year the starting line-up consisted of 3 Freshmen and 2 Sophomores.  After some early season struggles, the Jayhawks finished the season with thirteen conference wins, good enough for their second straight season in which the team had claimed a share of the championship.  Bill Self was named Big 12 Coach of the Year for the first time.  In postseason play the team defeated its conference opponents to claim its first Big 12 Championship title since 1999.  In the NCAA Division I tournament, the fourth seeded Jayhawks were defeated in the first round by Bradley, a 13 seed.

The season remains, as of the 2021-22 season, the most recent season the Jayhawks did not begin the season ranked and the most recent occasion of the team being eliminated in the first round of the NCAA Tournament. Kansas played its first 23 games unranked, which is (as of the 2021-22 season) the most consecutive games the Jayhawks have been unranked under Self. They've only played 13 other games being unranked, outside of the 2005-06 season.

Recruiting

Roster

Schedule

|-
!colspan=9| Exhibition

|-
!colspan=9| Regular season

|-
!colspan=9|Big 12 tournament

|-
!colspan=9| NCAA tournament

References

Kansas Jayhawks men's basketball seasons
Kansas
Jay
Jay
Kansas